Mark Moore (born February 15, 1939) is an American rower. He competed in the men's eight event at the 1960 Summer Olympics.

References

1939 births
Living people
American male rowers
Olympic rowers of the United States
Rowers at the 1960 Summer Olympics
Sportspeople from Whittier, California